Narudasia is a monotypic genus of geckos endemic to Namibia better known as festive gecko.

Festive gecko  (Narudasia festiva) is a diurnal, rock-dwelling gecko, reaching 2 to 3 inches in length, that lives on small insects. Body and head are somewhat flattened. Overall color is grey with alternating brownish bands on the back, edged with black and white towards the rear. The long tail may be yellow.

References 
 Branch, B. Field guide to the snakes and other reptiles of Southern Africa, New Holland Ltd., London, 1988.
 Rösler, H. Geckos der Welt. Alle Gattungen, Urania-Verlag, Leipzig, Jena, Berlin, 1995.

External links 
 Photograph

Endemic fauna of Namibia
Geckos
Monotypic lizard genera
Taxa named by John Hewitt (herpetologist)
Taxa named by Paul Ayshford Methuen